Jun No-min (born Jun Jae Yong on August 28, 1966) is a South Korean actor. Among his recent roles were the villainous Hwarang warrior Seolwon in Queen Seondeok, and the fictional independence fighter Damsari in Bridal Mask.

Filmography

Television series

 Missy Durian (2023)  
Oasis (2023) - Hwang Chung-seong
Three Bold Siblings (2022) - Kim Myung-jae 
The Law Cafe (2022) - Kim Seung-woon 
Kill Heel (2022) - Choi In-guk 
Love (ft. Marriage and Divorce) (2021)
Live On (2020) (cameo, ep 3)
The King: Eternal Monarch (2020) (special appearance, ep 4, ep 6)
Itaewon Class (2020) (cameo)
Doctor John (2019)
Risky Romance (2018) 
Secrets and Lies (2018)
Suits (2018) (special appearance, ep 7)
My Golden Life (2017-2018)
Hospital Ship (2017)
Ruler: Master of the Mask (2017)
Queen of the Ring (2017)
Entertainer (2016)
Memory (2016)
Six Flying Dragons (2015)
The Return of Hwang Geum-bok (2015)
Who Are You: School 2015 (2015)
More Than a Maid (2015)
A Mother's Choice (2014)
The Three Musketeers (2014)
Two Mothers (2014)
A Witch's Love (tvN / 2014) (guest, episodes 1-2)
Principal Investigator – Save Wang Jo-hyun! (2013) 
Medical Top Team (2013)
Love in Her Bag (2013)
Hur Jun, the Original Story (2013)
Nine (2013)
The King's Doctor (2012) (guest)
Five Fingers (2012)
Bridal Mask (KBS2 / 2012)
The Chaser (2012)
Love Again (2012)
God of War (2012) (cameo)
Bachelor's Vegetable Store (2011)
Deep Rooted Tree (2011) (guest)
Gyebaek (2011)
Royal Family (2011)
Queen Seondeok (2009)
Amnok River Flows (2008)
Family's Honor (2008)
Strongest Chil Woo (2008)
My Ex-wife Lives Next Door (2008)
Bad Woman, Good Woman (2007)
Love and Ambition (2006)
Island Village Teacher (2004)
A Saint and a Witch ( 2003)
Let's Get Married (2002)
My Name is Princess (2002)
Sunflower (1998)
Star in My Heart (1997)

Film
Welcome (2014)
In Love and the War (2011)
Sin of a Family (2011)
The Influence (2010)
The Circle (2003)

Variety show
Fraud Prevention Project: Trick (SBS / 2007)

Theater
 Linda and Joy (2022) as Story
M. Butterfly (2012)
추적 (2010)

Director 
 Common Life (2022)

Awards

Awards and nominations

2018 MBC Drama Awards: Best Supporting Actor in a Serial Drama (Secrets and Lies)
2012 20th Korean Culture and Entertainment Awards: Excellence Award, Actor (Bridal Mask)
2010 19th Buil Film Awards: Best Dressed
2006 SBS Drama Awards: Best Supporting Actor in a Serial Drama (Love and Ambition)

References

External links

 
 
 
 
 

People from Incheon
South Korean male television actors
South Korean male film actors
1966 births
Living people